Gerald Alfred "Jerry" Bell (born March 7, 1959) is a former American football tight end in the National Football League (NFL). He was drafted by the Tampa Bay Buccaneers in the third round of the 1982 NFL Draft. He played college football at Arizona State.
Graduated from El Cerrito High School, El Cerrito, CA, in 1977.

1959 births
Living people
People from Derby, Connecticut
Players of American football from Connecticut
American football tight ends
Arizona State Sun Devils football players
Tampa Bay Buccaneers players